Dollmania is a genus of moths in the family Lasiocampidae. The genus was erected by Tams in 1930.

Species
Dollmania cuprea Distant, 1897
Dollmania flavia Fawcett, 1915
Dollmania marwitzi Strand, 1913
Dollmania plinthochroa Tams, 1930
Dollmania purpurascens Aurivillius, 1908
Dollmania reussi Strand, 1913

References

Lasiocampidae